The 2004–05 season was F.C. Motagua's 54th season in existence and the club's 39th consecutive season in the top flight of Honduran football.

Overview
F.C. Motagua started the Apertura tournament under the management of Uruguayan coach Carlos Jurado.  Jurado was sacked after nine rounds due to poor results.  Former defender Hernaín Arzú was named as the replacement, who stayed until the end of the season.  However, he was unable to right the ship, finishing in the 9th position for the first time since 1966.

For the Clausura tournament, the club hired manager Edwin Pavón and kept Hernaín Arzú as his assistant.  For the fourth time in a row, Motagua was unable to enter the playoffs.

Players

Results

Apertura

Clausura

By round

Statistics
 As of 7 May 2005

References

External links
 Official website

F.C. Motagua seasons
Motagua
Motagua